Feels Like Carolina is the major label debut album by American country music group Parmalee. It was released on December 10, 2013, via Stoney Creek Records. The album produced four singles: "Musta Had a Good Time", "Carolina", "Close Your Eyes", and "Already Callin' You Mine".

Critical reception

Feels Like Carolina garnered generally positive reception by music critics. Joseph Hudak of Country Weekly gave the album a B− grade, praising the lyrics by saying that "While the album draws liberally from the country pool of shopworn images…the guys…have a knack for making them their own." He thought that the songs written by the band members were the strongest tracks but criticized the "prevailingly generic sound". At USA Today, Brian Mansfield rated the album two-and-a-half out of four stars, feeling that "these guys are a throwback to bands that fleshed out melodies and tight harmonies and classic rock guitar riffs." Glenn Gamboa of Newsday gave the album a B+ grade, calling the album "well-crafted". At Allmusic, Steve Leggett rated the album four out of five stars, noting the release "shows a band that, at its best, combines gritty Southern garage rock with lead singer Matt Thomas' pure country vocals." Markos Papadatos of Digital Journal rated the album four-and-a-half out of five stars, affirming that the release was "solid from start to finish." At Got Country Online, Tara Toro rated the album four-and-a-half out of five stars, stating that as a listener, they "can listen to from start to finish." Matt Bjorke of Roughstock wrote an unrated review of the album, writing that the album "showcases a tight band with a strong ear for melodies and lyrics which suit the same part of the genre which is also home to Eric Church and Jason Aldean, among others."

Track listing

Personnel

Parmalee
 Barry Knox - bass guitar, background vocals
 Josh McSwain - electric guitar, keyboards, background vocals
 Matt Thomas - acoustic guitar, electric guitar, lead vocals
 Scott Thomas - drums, percussion

Additional Musicians
 Kurt Allison - electric guitar
 Smith Curry - dobro
 Dan Dugmore - steel guitar
 David Fanning - programming
 Tony Harrell - keyboards
 Mike Johnson - steel guitar
 Tully Kennedy - bass guitar
 Rob McNelly - electric guitar
 Jason Mowery - banjo, fiddle, mandolin
 Russ Pahl - steel guitar
 Danny Rader - banjo, bouzouki, acoustic guitar
 Rich Redmond - percussion, programming
 Adam Shoenfeld - electric guitar

Chart performance

Weekly charts
The album debuted on Billboard 200 at No. 46 with sales of 14,000. The album has sold 91,200 copies in the U.S as of February 2015.

Year-end charts

Singles

References

2013 albums
Parmalee albums
BBR Music Group albums
Albums produced by New Voice Entertainment